Gerald Fenwick Metcalfe  (23 August 1871 – 17 October 1953) was a British portrait painter, miniaturist, illustrator and modeller. He was born at Landour, India.  In 1881 he was living with his widowed mother in Walcot, Somerset. He studied at the South Kensington, St John's Wood (where he met Byam Shaw, also born in India) and Royal Academy Schools. He was working in Chelsea 1902–03 and at Albury, Surrey, 1914–25.

Selected works 

 Pan 
 Study for the War Memorial at Albury, Surrey 
 The Molson Brothers: Harold and Eric, sons of John Elsdale Molson

References

External links
 

British people of Indian descent
British illustrators
19th-century British painters
British male painters
20th-century British painters
Alumni of the Royal College of Art
1871 births
1953 deaths
19th-century British male artists
20th-century British male artists